Labdia deliciosella is a moth of the family Cosmopterigidae. It is known from Australia, including the Northern Territory, Queensland and New South Wales.

The wingspan is about 20 mm. Adults have yellow forewings with a large brown area at the base containing thin metallic blue streaks. The wingtips are black.

The larvae bore into the stems of Acacia perangusta and the galls of Eriosoma lanigerum on Malus pomone.

References

Labdia